Colin Holba (born July 8, 1994) is a former American football long snapper. He played college football at Louisville. Holba was drafted by the Pittsburgh Steelers in the sixth round (213th overall) of the 2017 NFL Draft.

Early life
While in high school, Holba played three years of football and four years of baseball. He also made honor roll for all four years of high school and graduated as valedictorian at Eastern High School. Inspired by the influence of his older brother.  He can attribute all of his collegiate and professional sporting success to his older brother, Brendan Holba, a high school teacher and varsity softball coach at York Community High School in Elmhurst, Illinois.

College career
Holba played college football at the University of Louisville. While in college he met his wife Lauren Dale Holba, former Ladybird. They married June 23, 2018. 

He played with Lamar Jackson while at Louisville.

Professional career

Pittsburgh Steelers
Holba was drafted by the Pittsburgh Steelers in the sixth round, 213th overall, in the 2017 NFL Draft. He was the first Louisville Cardinal to be drafted in the 2017 NFL Draft. On May 11, 2017, the Steelers signed Holba to a four-year, $2.52 million contract with a signing bonus of $129,314.

He was selected in the draft to be the replacement for long time veteran Greg Warren. Throughout training camp he competed with Kameron Canaday. On September 2, 2017, Holba was waived after losing the competition for the vacant long snapper position to Canaday.

Jacksonville Jaguars
On November 14, 2017, Holba was signed by the Jacksonville Jaguars after long snapper Matt Overton sustained a shoulder injury and was placed on injured reserve.

On June 14, 2018, Holba was waived by the Jaguars.

San Francisco 49ers
On December 5, 2018, Holba signed a two-year deal with the San Francisco 49ers as a replacement for suspended long-snapper Kyle Nelson.

On September 17, 2019, Holba was released by the 49ers.

In October 2019, Holba was selected by the Dallas Renegades in the 2020 XFL Draft.

New York Giants
On November 12, 2019, Holba was signed to the New York Giants practice squad. On November 30, he was signed to the active roster after Zak DeOssie was placed on injured reserve, playing 5 games with the Giants. On April 28, 2020, the Giants waived Holba.

Los Angeles Rams
On December 9, 2020, Holba was signed to the Los Angeles Rams' practice squad.

San Francisco 49ers (second stint)
On December 29, 2020, Holba was signed by the San Francisco 49ers off the Rams practice squad. He was waived on January 6, 2021.

Los Angeles Rams (second stint)
On January 15, 2021, Holba was signed to the Los Angeles Rams' practice squad. He signed a reserve/future contract on January 18, 2021. He was waived on May 12, 2021.

Cincinnati Bengals
On December 30, 2021, Holba was signed to the Cincinnati Bengals practice squad. He was released on January 18, 2022.

Retirement
Holba announced his retirement from professional football on February 28, 2022.

References

External links
San Francisco 49ers bio
Louisville Cardinals bio

1994 births
Living people
Players of American football from Louisville, Kentucky
Eastern High School (Louisville, Kentucky) alumni
American football long snappers
Louisville Cardinals football players
Pittsburgh Steelers players
Jacksonville Jaguars players
San Francisco 49ers players
New York Giants players
Los Angeles Rams players
Cincinnati Bengals players